Alaminos, officially the Municipality of Alaminos,  is a 3rd class municipality in the province of Laguna, Philippines. According to the 2020 census, it has a population of 51,619 people.

The Municipality of Alaminos is an agro-industrial town that lies within the third congressional district of the Province of Laguna and is part of the Calabarzon. Based on the municipal zoning, the industrial sites are located along Maharlika Highway of Barangays San Andres, San Juan, San Agustin and San Benito. Here, lands are available for industrial and commercial purposes. Barangays San Andres and San Juan will also be developed as a techno park for farm housing, industrial and commercial purposes.

History
Alaminos began as a barrio of San Pablo City, which was then only a town of the Province of Batangas. Its initial name was Trenchera, denoting the presence of long and deep ravines. The early inhabitants of Trenchera were believed to be insurrectionists, and possibly fugitives, who took advantage of the numerous trenches for hiding as well as for defense against the Spanish authority.

Sometime in 1873 when a certain Don Andres Penaloza was the Gobernadorcillo (equivalent to Mayor) of the town of San Pablo, Trenchera was formally separated and became a pueblo or town but remained part of the Batangas. Don Cirilo Baylon, a wealthy resident of Trenchera and with good command of the Spanish language, invited Captain-General Juan de Alaminos Nivera, the Chief Executive of the province whose capital seat was Lipa. The Captain-General accepted the invitation and came in a colorful carriage drawn by two horses. With Don Cirilo Baylon leading, he was warmly received by the residents of Trenchera. Dona Gregoria Baylon, the younger sister of Don Cirilo Baylon presented bouquets of fresh flowers to the Captain-General.

During the program in honor of the Captain General and his party, Don Cirilo Baylon presented the petition of the residents asking that Trenchera be made into a duly organized and recognized town. The petition was read in public and the Captain General gave assurance to consider their wish favorably. In less than 2 months the official paper proclaiming Trenchera as a new pueblo or town arrived from Lipa.

At the same time, Don Cirilo Baylon was appointed the first Gobernadorcillo or town mayor in concurrent capacity as Capitan de los Constables de Pueblo or the equivalent of the local police chief. In appreciation of Capitan General Juan de Alaminos Nivera, the new pueblo was named Alaminos in 1873 and remained part of Batangas until 1903.

Geography
The municipalities of Calauan and Bay are located north of Alaminos, the city of San Pablo on the south and east and the municipality of Santo Tomas in Batangas province on its west.

There are three main rivers in Alaminos, namely Kaquinkong, Onipa and Tigas.

The Maharlika Highway passes through the municipality and is connected directly to Manila through the South Luzon Expressway.

Barangays
Alaminos is politically subdivided into 15 barangays 4 four of which are classified as urban barangays: Barangay I, II, III and IV, while the rest are classified as rural. Brgy. San Gregorio is the biggest barangay measuring 840.6190 hectares followed by Brgy. Santa Rosa measuring 802.28 hectares.

Climate

Demographics

Economy 

A 120 MW solar power plant with a 40MW/60MWh grid battery operates near the city.

Government

List of local chief executives

The following is the list of mayors of Alaminos since 1944. Hernandez Sr. and Masa were appointed as Mayors. Donato died in office, with Vice Mayor Flores assuming the position of mayor following Donato's death.

Demetrio Hernandez Sr. (1944–1946)*
Felimon Masa (1947–1948)
Daniel Fandiño (1948–1951)
Lorenzo Dimayuga (1952–1955)
Pedro De Villa (1956–1963)
Casimiro Faylona (1968–1971)
Pedro De Villa (1968–1971)
Armando M. Bueser (1972–1979)
Francisco Donato (1980–1982)
Mariano Flores (1982–1987)
Samuel F. Bueser (1988–1998)
Demetrio P. Hernandez Jr. (1998–2001)
Samuel F. Bueser (May 14, 2001 – 2007)
Eladio M. Magampon (2007–2016)
Loreto M. Masa (2016–2019)
Eladio M. Magampon (2019–2021)
Ruben Alvarez (2021–2022)
Glenn Flores (2022–Present)

Culture
The religious patron of the town of Alaminos is the Nuestra Señora Del Pilar. On October 12 annually, the town fiesta of Alaminos is celebrated.

Special events/festivals 
Town Fiesta, October 12

Notable personalities
Ariella Arida – Miss Universe 2013 3rd Runner-up and co-host of GMA 7 gameshow Wowowin

References

External links

[ Philippine Standard Geographic Code]
Philippine Census Information
Local Governance Performance Management System

Municipalities of Laguna (province)